The All Japan High School Women's Soccer Tournament of Japan is an annual nationwide high school association women's football tournament organized by the Japan Football Association.

First played in 1992, the final tournament was originally held in Kobe. In 2002 it was moved to Iwata, but in 2014 the competition was moved to Kobe. It used to take place in summer, but since the 2012 edition it has been played in January during the winter school vacation period, like the male High School Tournament. The tournament is broadcast by TBS.

Slots by regions
 As of the 2022 edition.

Champions

References

 
Football competitions in Japan
Women's football in Japan
Youth football competitions
Youth football in Japan
Recurring sporting events established in 1992